Protesilaus orthosilaus  is a species of butterfly found in the Neotropical realm (the Mato Grosso of Brazil and also Paraguay).

Description
Antenna yellow-brown, not black. Frons yellowish white at the sides. Forewing transparent: hindwing strongly dentate, above also with a median band, the postdiscal band and the black margin merged into a broad marginal band, the yellowish marginal and submarginal lunules smaller. Paraguay and Gojaz in Brazil; rare.

Status
Formerly believed to be rare, but has now been seen to occur over a very wide area of the Mato Grosso where it can be seen year round in the cerrado. Males are found in sandy areas and females seek nectar.

References

Further reading
D'Abrera, B. (1981). Butterflies of the Neotropical Region. Part I. Papilionidae and Pieridae. Lansdowne Editions, Melbourne, xvi + 172 pp.
D'Almeida, R.F. (1965). Catalogo dos Papilionidae Americanos. Sociedade Brasileira de Entomologia. São Paulo, Brasil.
Rothschild, W. and Jordan, K. (1906). A revision of the American Papilios. Novitates Zoologicae 13: 411-752. online (and as pdf) (Facsimile edition ed. P.H. Arnaud, 1967).

External links
 Butterflies of the Americas Images

Papilionidae
Fauna of Brazil
Papilionidae of South America
Butterflies described in 1899